Murray Corner is a community in the Canadian province of New Brunswick in Westmorland County on Route 955.

Murray Corner is on the Northumberland Strait;
its main sources of recreation are boating, snowmobiling, horseback riding and other outdoor activities.  Murray Corner is also the home of the Murray Beach Provincial Park.

History

Notable people

See also
List of communities in New Brunswick

References

Communities in Westmorland County, New Brunswick
Designated places in New Brunswick
Local service districts of Westmorland County, New Brunswick